Dimitrana Ivanova, née Petrova (1881–1960), was a Bulgarian educational reformer, suffragist and women's rights activist. She chaired the Bulgarian Women's Union from 1926 to 1944.

Biography
Ivanova née Petrova was born on 1 February 1881 in Rousse, Bulgaria. The daughter of a trader, she was educated in the local girls' school and high school for girls. In Bulgaria, women were allowed to listen into lectures at the University of Sofia from 1896, but could not be regular students there until 1901, and even then it remained difficult, as high schools for girls offered only six of the seven secondary grades required for university admission. Dimitrana Ivanova was denied a place to study law in Sofia on these grounds, but she became the first female to study education and philosophy at the University of Zürich. When she returned to Bulgaria in 1900, she was employed as a teacher, which was at the time practically the only profession open to women (although until 1904, banned for married women). In 1914, she married the teacher Doncho Ivanov, but continued her professional life (the ban against married women teachers having been lifted in 1904). In 1921, she applied to study in the Faculty of Law at the University of Sofia, and was eventually allowed to do so, graduating in 1927.

Women's suffrage
In 1926, she succeeded Julia Malinova as chairperson of her country's leading women's rights organization, the Bulgarian Women's Union, which had been founded in 1901. In 1935–40, she was a member of the board of the International Alliance of Women. She became a well-known controversial figure in public debate and was frequently caricatured in the press. During her tenure as chairperson, two issues was given much attention: permission for women to practice law, which was seen as an important symbolic question, symbolizing the right of women to enter other professions of the same kind; and the right to women's suffrage. Bulgarian women gained a conditional right to vote in 1937, but they could not stand for election themselves if they were widowed, married or divorced. 

Ivanova was arrested after the communist takeover of Bulgaria in 1944, when all civic "bourgeois" organizations were abolished. She was released on the intervention of one of her contacts in the communist movement in 1945.

References

1881 births
1960 deaths
Bulgarian women's rights activists
Bulgarian feminists
19th-century Bulgarian people
Bulgarian suffragists
19th-century Bulgarian women